Kim Allan Williams Sr. (born 1954) is an American cardiologist. He is a Fellow of the American College of Cardiology and served as its president from 2015 to 2016. He is currently a trustee of the organization.

Education 
Williams graduated from the University of Chicago in 1975 and the Pritzker School of Medicine at the University of Chicago in 1979.

Career 
He has board certifications in internal medicine, cardiovascular diseases, nuclear medicine, nuclear cardiology, and cardiovascular computed tomography. He has served on the faculty of the Pritzker School of Medicine, the Wayne State University School of Medicine in Detroit, Michigan, and since 2013 at Rush University Medical Center in Chicago, where he is the head of the cardiology department.

Williams has served as president of the American Society of Nuclear Cardiology, chairman of the Coalition of Cardiovascular Organizations, and chairman of the board of the Association of Black Cardiologists, among other positions.

In July 2022, Williams became the 24th Chair of the University of Louisville Department of Medicine in Louisville, KY.

Veganism 
Williams has been vegan since 2003; after being selected as incoming president of the American College of Cardiology in 2014, he published an essay on his reasons for being vegan and his belief in the cardiovascular benefits of veganism in MedPage Today. Some questioned his views and motives for writing the essay, but Williams maintained that his enthusiasm for plant-based diets was based on his interpretation of medical literature and his own experience lowering his cholesterol by removing dairy and animal protein. 

In 2020, he wrote the foreword to Healthy at Last, a book about plant-based eating by Eric Adams, at the time the Borough President of Brooklyn, New York City, and now mayor of New York City.

References

External links 

 

1955 births
Living people
African-American people
American cardiologists
American veganism activists
Fellows of the American College of Cardiology
People from Chicago
Plant-based diet advocates